Reda Abdel Aal (born 15 March 1965) is an Egyptian football coach and former player.

International career
Reda was a member of Egypt national football team in 1994 African Nations Cup. He made some appearances with the team in 1994 FIFA World Cup qualification matches.

Managerial statistics

References

External links

 
 

1965 births
Living people
Egyptian footballers
Egypt international footballers
Egyptian football managers
Association football midfielders